"Do You Like It?" is a song by Australian R&B band Kulcha. It was released in September 1996 as the lead single from the band's second studio album Take Your Time. The song peaked at number 18 in Australia.

Track listing

CD single
 "Do You Like It" (radio mix) - 3:39	
 "Do You Like It" (12" Dub mix) - 4:12
 "Do You Like It" (Bubberman Vs JC House mix) -	6:20
 "Bring It On" (Laidback mix) - 3:34	
 "Do You Like It" (accapella)

Charts

References

1996 songs
1996 singles
Kulcha (band) songs
Dance-pop songs